Hodonín is a municipality and village in Blansko District in the South Moravian Region of the Czech Republic. It has about 100 inhabitants.

History
The first written mention of Hodonín is from 1360. The most important owners of the village were the Pernštejn family that granted the village some privileges.

During World War II, Romani people were imprisoned at the Hodonín concentration camp, before being transported to the Auschwitz extermination camp. Around 1,300 prisoners passed through the camp, 194 died.

References

External links

Villages in Blansko District